Noordijk may refer to:

 Noordijk, Gelderland, a place in the Dutch province of Gelderland
 Noordijk, Overijssel, a place in the Dutch province of Overijssel

See also 
 Noorddijk (disambiguation)